Albert E. Partridge (born 1901) was an English professional footballer who played as an outside right.

Career
Born in Birmingham, Partridge played for Sheffield United, Bradford City and Northampton Town. For Bradford City, he made 55 appearances in the Football League; he also made 3 FA Cup appearances.

Sources

References

1901 births
Year of death missing
English footballers
Sheffield United F.C. players
Bradford City A.F.C. players
Northampton Town F.C. players
English Football League players
Association football outside forwards